Sinacalia is a genus of Chinese plants in the groundsel tribe within the daisy family.

 Species
 Sinacalia caroli (C.Winkl.) C.Jeffrey & Y.L.Chen - Gansu, Sichuan
 Sinacalia davidii (Franch.) H.Koyama - Shaanxi, Sichuan, Tibet, Yunnan
 Sinacalia macrocephala (H.Rob. & Brettell) C.Jeffrey & Y.L.Chen - Hubei 
 Sinacalia tangutica (Maxim.) B.Nord - Gansu, Hebei, Henan, Hubei, Hunan, Ningxia, Qinghai, Shaanxi, Shanxi, Sichuan

References

Senecioneae
Asteraceae genera
Endemic flora of China